Vakasalewalewa are people from Fiji, who were born assigned male at birth but who have a feminine gender expression. In Fiji this is understood as a traditional third gender identity, culturally specific to the country.

Etymology 
The term comes from Fijian and translates as "acting in the manner of a woman"; it has connotations of a traditional cultural way of life.

Vakasalewalewa is included in the acronym MVPFAFF+ (mahu, vakasalewalewa, palopa, fa'afafine, akava'ine, fakaleiti or leiti, fakafifine, and other), coined by Phylesha Brown-Acton, to "enhance Pasifika gender diversity awareness in addition to the term LGBTQI".

History and culture 
Colonial historical records are silent on the role of vakasalewalewa in Fijian society. However, like many other gender identities in Oceania, such as akava'ine in the Cook Islands or Fa'afafine in Samoa, that these identities existed and were valued in pre-modern Fiji. Activist Shaneel Lal argues that prior to colonisation, vakasalewalewa were integral to native Fijijan society. Lal claims that colonisation stripped Fijians of their rich queer identities and conditioned them with homophobia, transphobia and queerphobia.

According to Joey Joleen Mataele, many vakasalewalewa work in hospitality industries.

Reception 
In Geir Henning Presterudsten's study of  communities, they reported that many rejected the label of vakasalewalewa, believing it to be "old-fashioned" or "restrictive".

Notable vakasalewalewa 

 Kalisito Biaukula - broadcaster and human rights activist.
 Shaneel Lal - queer and indigenous rights activist.

References 

Gender in Oceania
Gender systems
Third gender
Transgender in Oceania
Fijian culture